Sybarite may refer to:
 Sybarite, a native of Sybaris, an ancient Greek city in southern Italy
 Sybarite (musician), New York electronic musician
 Sybarite (fashion doll)
 Sybarite (comics) or Skein, a fictional supervillain in comic books by Marvel Comics